Lilij Gavaber (also Romanized as Līlīj Gavāber; also known as Lalīj Gavāber) is a village in Shabkhus Lat Rural District, Rankuh District, Amlash County, Gilan Province, Iran. At the 2006 census, its population was 98, in 22 families.

References 

Populated places in Amlash County